O'Cyrus Torrence (born January 20, 2000) is an American football offensive guard for the Florida Gators. He previously played for the Louisiana Ragin' Cajuns before transferring to Florida in 2022, where he named a consensus All-American.

Early life and high school
Torrence grew up in Greensburg, Louisiana and attended St. Helena Central High School. He was a three-star recruit and committed to play college football at Louisiana–Lafayette over offers from Georgia, Louisiana Tech, Louisiana–Monroe, South Alabama, Southern Mississippi, and Middle Tennessee.

College career
Torrence began his college career at Louisiana–Lafayette. He started 13 of the Ragin' Cajuns' 14 games as a true freshman. In his sophomore season, he started all 11 of Louisiana's games and was named second team All-Sunbelt Conference. As a junior Torrence started 12 games at right guard, missing two games due to an injury, and was named first team All-Sun Belt and rated the fourth-best offensive guard in the nation by Pro Football Focus. After the end of the season he entered the NCAA transfer portal.

Torrence ultimately transferred to Florida, following former Louisiana–Lafayette head coach Billy Napier. He was named a consensus All-American that season.

References

External links
 
 Florida Gators bio
 Louisiana Ragin' Cajuns bio

Living people
2000 births
All-American college football players
American football offensive guards
Florida Gators football players
Louisiana Ragin' Cajuns football players
Players of American football from Louisiana
People from Greensburg, Louisiana